Alexi Pappas or Alexia Pappa (Greek Αλεξία Παππά; born 28 March 1990) is a Greek-American runner, filmmaker, actor, and writer. Pappas was an NCAA All-American athlete at both Dartmouth College and the University of Oregon. She represented Greece at the 2016 Summer Olympics, setting the national record for 10k.

Early life and education
Pappas was born on 28 March 1990, to a Greek-American father who has roots from Rhodes and an American mother. She has a brother who is four years older. Pappas grew up in Alameda, California. Her mother died by suicide when Pappas was four years old.

Athletic career

Bishop O'Dowd High School California Interscholastic Federation
As a sophomore at Oakland's Bishop O'Dowd High School, Pappas placed fourth in the Division III girls 5K race at the California Interscholastic Federation State Cross Country Championships in 2005. 

Pappas's high school coach refused to let her participate in multiple sports, even though boys at the same high school were permitted to do so, and stated that this affected her physical development.

NCAA
Pappas was a two-time NCAA all-American at Dartmouth College. She was one of nine finalists for the 2012 NCAA Woman of the Year award. She also won the 2012 season's Ivy League title in the steeplechase (9:58.80) and qualified for the 2012 U.S. Olympic Trials in Eugene. Pappas graduated magna cum laude in creative writing and English from Dartmouth College in 2012.

Pappas attended the University of Oregon as a master's student, where she earned three NCAA Division I All-American awards. She finished eighth individually at the 2012 NCAA Cross Country Championships with a time of 19:43.9 (6,000 meters) helping the Oregon Ducks women's cross country team win the national title. She graduated from Oregon with a Master of Fine Arts in creative writing in 2013.

2016 Olympics
Pappas became a Greek citizen on 8 January 2016 and on 1 May that year she broke the 10,000 m Greek national record, which had stood since 2002. She represented Greece at the 2016 Summer Olympics. At the Olympic finals, she improved her national record when she finished 17th in 31:36.16.

2022 Boston Marathon
Pappas served as a guide for para-athlete Lisa Thompson in the 2022 Boston Marathon, who won the T13 (Visual Impairment) Division with a time of 3:47:25.

Honors

Filmmaking
Pappas has made several movies as a director, writer, actor, and producer. These include Tall as the Baobab Tree (2012), Speed Goggles (2016), Tracktown (2017), and Olympic Dreams (2019), which was the first fictional movie filmed in an Olympic village.

Author
Pappas's first book, Bravey: Chasing Dreams, Befriending Pain, and Other Big Ideas, with a foreword by Maya Rudolph, was published on 12 January 2021.

Personal life
In 2020 Pappas published a video about her struggle with depression, calling for better care of elite athletes' mental health.

References

External links
 
 
 
 Author Profile for Alexi Pappas on Amazon Books

1990 births
Living people
Track and field athletes from Oregon
Track and field athletes from California
Greek female long-distance runners
American female long-distance runners
Greek female steeplechase runners
American female steeplechase runners
Olympic athletes of Greece
Athletes (track and field) at the 2016 Summer Olympics
Dartmouth Big Green women's track and field athletes
Oregon Ducks women's track and field athletes
American people of Greek descent
Greek people of American descent
Greek film producers
American film producers
Greek film actresses
American film actresses
Oregon Ducks women's cross country runners
Dartmouth Big Green women's cross country runners